The Siersza Power Station is a coal-fired thermal power station in Trzebinia, Poland. It is operated by TAURON Wytwarzanie. There are 6 turbo generators (two are no longer used) and 3 chimneys. The installed capacity is 546 MWe and the thermal capacity is 61 MWt. The remaining thermal energy is used locally.

External links

 

Energy infrastructure completed in 1970
Coal-fired power stations in Poland
Cogeneration power stations in Poland
Trzebinia
Buildings and structures in Lesser Poland Voivodeship